Timo Brauer (born 30 May 1990) is a German professional footballer who plays as a midfielder for Oberliga Niederrhein club TVD Velbert.

References

External links
 

1990 births
Footballers from Essen
Living people
German footballers
Association football midfielders
Rot-Weiss Essen players
Alemannia Aachen players
Hamburger SV II players
SV Grödig players
Sportfreunde Lotte players
Austrian Football Bundesliga players
3. Liga players
Regionalliga players
Oberliga (football) players
German expatriate footballers
German expatriate sportspeople in Austria
Expatriate footballers in Austria